Mariusz Siembida  (born 21 March 1975 in Puławy, Lubelskie) is a retired backstroke swimmer from Poland, who competed for his native country at two consecutive Summer Olympics, starting in 1996 (Atlanta, Georgia).

A member of Lublinianka he is best known for winning the bronze medal at the 1997 European Swimming Championships in the men's 4×100 m medley relay, alongside Marek Krawczyk, Marcin Kaczmarek and Bartosz Kizierowski.

References

1975 births
Living people
Polish male backstroke swimmers
Olympic swimmers of Poland
Swimmers at the 1996 Summer Olympics
Swimmers at the 2000 Summer Olympics
People from Puławy
Medalists at the FINA World Swimming Championships (25 m)
European Aquatics Championships medalists in swimming
Sportspeople from Lublin Voivodeship
Universiade medalists in swimming
Universiade gold medalists for Poland
Universiade bronze medalists for Poland
Medalists at the 1997 Summer Universiade
Medalists at the 2001 Summer Universiade